General elections were held in British Guiana on 27 April 1953. They were the first held under universal suffrage and resulted in a victory for the People's Progressive Party (PPP), which won 18 of the 24 seats in the new House of Assembly. Its leader, Cheddi Jagan, became Prime Minister.

Electoral system
Constitutional reforms as a result of the Waddington Commission had led to the creation of the House of Assembly to replace the Legislative Council. The new House had 28 members; 24 members elected in single member constituencies, a speaker appointed by the Governor and three ex officio members (the Chief Secretary, the Attorney General and the Financial Secretary).

Campaign
The PPP ran candidates in 22 of the 24 constituencies, failing to contest the two interior constituencies due to a lack of money. The National Democratic Party contested 15 constituencies and the People's National Party eight. A total of 85 independents, including four United Guiana Party candidates, also contested the elections. The United Workers and Farmers Party did run as a party, but contested some seats as independents.

Results

Elected members

Aftermath
After assuming power Jagan embarked on implementing a series of policies that involved radical social reform, mainly directed at the colonial oligarchy. The British colonial authorities sent in troops in response to the alleged threat of a Marxist revolution. Governor Alfred Savage suspended the constitution in October (only 133 days after it had come into force) and set up a transitional government of conservative politicians, businessmen and civil servants. Writing in The Guardian in 2020, Gaiutra Bahadur said that "the overthrow of Guyana’s ruling party by colonial forces fomented a racial divide that continues to blight its politics", saying that there was a greater crackdown on the Afro-Guyanese than on the Indo-Guyanese, in a deliberate and successful attempt to divide the PPP.

References

British Guiana
Elections in Guyana
General election
British Guiana